Helen Ukaonu (born 17 May 1991) is a Nigerian footballer who plays as a defender. She represented the Nigeria women's national team.

After four seasons at Sunnanå SK, Ukaona's contract was not renewed in December 2014.

Eugen Ebube: Cousin.
Saviour Chinonso Amaechi: Cousin.

References

External links
 
 Goal profile
 
 MTN football profile

1991 births
Living people
People from Abuja
Nigerian women's footballers
Women's association football defenders
Sunnanå SK players
Damallsvenskan players
Nigeria women's international footballers
2011 FIFA Women's World Cup players
Nigerian expatriate women's footballers
Nigerian expatriate sportspeople in Sweden
Expatriate women's footballers in Sweden